The Hirtshals railway line is a  long standard gauge single track railway line between Hjørring and Hirtshals, Denmark. The railway links the fishing and ferry port of Hirtshals with the Danish rail network.

The railway line opened in 1925. It is currently owned and operated by the railway company Nordjyske Jernbaner (NJ) which runs frequent local train services from Hirtshals station to Hjørring station with onward connections from Hjørring to the rest of Denmark.

History 

The main line to Aalbæk was never constructed however, but the branch line to Hirtshals was built instead. Construction started in April 1924, and the railway was opened on 18 December the following year.

From the start, the railway line was operated together with the Hjørring-Løkken-Aabybro Line and the Hjørring-Hørby Line in the joint operating company Hjørring Privatbaner (HP).

In 2001, the operating company Hjørring Privatbaner merged with Skagensbanen to form the railway company Nordjyske Jernbaner (NJ). Headquartered in Hjørring, the company is now responsible for running the Hjørring–Hirtshals and Frederikshavn–Skagen lines.

In 2005 the current Siemens Desiro trains, which have a maximum speed of 120 km/h (75 mph), were introduced.

Operations

Local trains 
Nordjyske Jernbaner (NJ) runs frequent local train services from Hirtshals station to Hjørring station with onward connections from Hjørring to the rest of Denmark.

Express service 
An international passenger service, Nordpilen, between Hirtshals and Hamburg, connecting with the ferries to and from Norway, ceased many years ago.

Freight 
Apart from local passenger traffic, there are transit freight trains linking Norway to the European continent. The freight cars are transferred on the railway ferry from Hirtshals to Kristiansand.

Stations

Previous stations
Color Line - between Lilleheden halt and Hirtshals station
Raundrup - between Horne station and Tornby station
Sønderby - between Tornby station and Vidstrup station
Langholm - between Vellingshøj station and Vidstrup station

See also
 List of railway lines in Denmark
 Skagensbanen

References

Notes

Bibliography

External links

 Nordjyske Jernbaner – Danish railway company operating in North Jutland Region
 Nordjyllands Jernbaner – website with information on railway history in North Jutland
 Danske Jernbaner – website with information on railway history in Denmark

Railway lines in Denmark
Railway lines opened in 1925
1925 establishments in Denmark
Rail transport in the North Jutland Region